Mangkunegara IX (18 August 1951 – 13 August 2021) was the traditional ruler of the former state of Mangkunegaran, located in Java, Indonesia. He succeeded his father, Mangkunegara VIII, as Duke of Mangkunegaran on 3 September 1987. His full royal name was Kanjeng Gusti Pangeran Adipati Arya Mangkunegara.

Prior to his accession he was named Gusti Pangeran Hadiningrat Sujiwa Kusuma. In the meantime G.P.H. Sudjiwo Kusumo became viceroy in Mangkunegaran.

His accession was controversial because for the first time in Indonesian history, Mangkunegaran involved relatives outside the core to participate in the decision.

Early life 
He was born in Surakarta the son of Mangkunegara VIII with brothers crown prince G.P.H. Radityo Prabukusumo, B.R.Aj. Retno Satuti. Rahadiyan Yamin, B.R.Aj. Retno Rosati Hudiono Kadarisman, B.R.M. Susaktyo, B.R.M. Herwasto, B.R.M. Kumiyakto and B.R.Aj. Retno Astrini.

His maternal grandfather and father were their brother and sister's son Mangkunegara V. His maternal grandfather was Prince Suryakusuma descended from the father whose grandfather was Mangkunegara VII.

Personal life and death 
Prince Sudjiwo Kusumo was previously married to Sukmawati Sukarnoputri, the third daughter of Indonesia’s founding president Sukarno and his wife Fatmawati. They divorced in 1984 after they had two children. After his ascension to throne, he married Prisca Marina, the only daughter of former ambassador and military officer Yogi Supardi, on 28 June 1990. Minister of Defence L. B. Moerdani, Coordinating Minister for People's Welfare Supardjo Rustam, and Chairman of the Indonesian Olympic Committee Surono Reksodimedjo became their wedding witnesses. He had two children with Marina.

He died at the age of 69 on 13 August 2021 in Jakarta, five days short of his 70th birthday.

Crown Prince 
G.P.H. Sudjiwo Kusumo became the crown prince, replacing his brother G.P.H. Radityo Prabukusumo who died in 1987. He was the fourth son of Mangkunegara VIII.

Existence dilemma 
The King is no longer the head of government of his nominal territory. The monarchy was originally supplanted when the area was colonized by the Netherlands. Following the end of colonial rule, it retained its ceremonial role.

References 

1951 births
2021 deaths
Princes of Mangkunegaran
People from Surakarta